East Kilbride RFC are a rugby union side who are based in East Kilbride.

History

Established in 1968, their home games are played at Torrance House.

EKRFC moved to the Torrance Arena in 1971, which led to steady progress through the divisions, which finally saw them spend 3 seasons in Premier 2 and winning the BT shield.

East Kilbride Sevens

The club run the East Kilbride Sevens.

New Town Sevens

This Sevens tournament was peripatetic around the new towns of Scotland:- East Kilbride, Glenrothes, Cumbernauld, Livingston and Irvine. The town's rugby clubs of East Kilbride RFC, Glenrothes RFC, Cumbernauld RFC, Livingston RFC and Irvine RFC would play in a Sevens tournament to become the New Town Sevens Champions and the Scottish New Towns Cup.

Notable players

Glasgow Warriors

The following former East Kilbride players have represented Glasgow Warriors at professional level.

Honours

 West Region Shield
 Champions (1): 2019
 Glasgow City Sevens
 Champions (1): 1998
 New Towns Sevens
 Champions (1): 1975, 1982
 East Kilbride Sevens
 Champions (1): 1985
 Lanarkshire Sevens
 Champions (1): 1987
 Helensburgh Sevens
 Champions: 1976, 1978, 1980, 1985
 Hamilton Sevens
 Champions: 1986
 Cambuslang Sevens
 Champions: 1989

References

External links
Official Website

Scottish rugby union teams
East Kilbride
Rugby union in South Lanarkshire